The Burt-Arrington House is a historic house located in Hillardston, North Carolina. It is a double pile, two and half story Federal-style frame building. The house was built around 1824 for Dr. William Burt, a physician and planter. In 1838, the property was sold to Dr. John Arrington for $6,000. The home was passed down through the Arrington family until 1902, and then was sold a number of times in the 20th century. Today, the home is a private residence and has retained its Federal and Greek Revival-style interior details.

References 

National Register of Historic Places in Nash County, North Carolina